His Majesty's Ambassador to the Republic of Kosovo is the United Kingdom's foremost diplomatic representative in the Republic of Kosovo, and is in charge of the British mission in Pristina.

The Republic of Kosovo declared its independence on 17 February 2008. The United Kingdom recognised the Republic of Kosovo as an independent state the following day and Mr David Blunt, who had been in Pristina since 2006 as head of the British office, was appointed the first ambassador.

Ambassadors
2008: David Blunt
2008–2010: Andrew Sparkes
2011–2015: Ian Cliff
2015–2019: Ruairí O'Connell

2019-:  Nicholas Abbott

See also
Embassy of the United Kingdom, Pristina

References

External links
UK and Kosovo, gov.uk

Kosovo
 
Ambassadors